This is a list of wars involving Tonga.

References

Tonga
Wars involving Tonga
Wars